Massachusetts House of Representatives' 19th Middlesex district in the United States is one of 160 legislative districts included in the lower house of the Massachusetts General Court. It covers part of Middlesex County. Democrat Dave Robertson of Tewksbury has represented the district since 2019.

Towns represented
The district includes the following localities:
 part of Tewksbury
 part of Wilmington

The current district geographic boundary overlaps with those of the Massachusetts Senate's 1st Essex and Middlesex district and 2nd Essex and Middlesex district.

Former locales
The district previously covered:
 Acton, circa 1872 
 Sudbury, circa 1872 
 Wayland, circa 1872

Representatives
 Charles S. Converse, circa 1858 
 Nathan Wyman, circa 1859 
 E. H. Blake, circa 1888 
 Eden K. Bowser, circa 1920 
 John Brox, circa 1951 
 Charles E. Ferguson, circa 1951 
 Lois G. Pines, circa 1975 
 James R. Miceli
 David Allen Robertson, 2019-current

See also
 List of Massachusetts House of Representatives elections
 List of Massachusetts General Courts
 List of former districts of the Massachusetts House of Representatives
 Other Middlesex County districts of the Massachusetts House of Representatives: 1st, 2nd, 3rd, 4th, 5th, 6th, 7th, 8th, 9th, 10th, 11th, 12th, 13th, 14th, 15th, 16th, 17th, 18th, 20th, 21st, 22nd, 23rd, 24th, 25th, 26th, 27th, 28th, 29th, 30th, 31st, 32nd, 33rd, 34th, 35th, 36th, 37th

Images
Portraits of legislators

References

External links
 Ballotpedia
  (State House district information based on U.S. Census Bureau's American Community Survey).

House
Government of Middlesex County, Massachusetts